The National Assistance Act 1948 is an Act of Parliament passed in the United Kingdom by the Labour government of Clement Attlee. It formally abolished the Poor Law system that had existed since the reign of Elizabeth I, and established a social safety net for those who did not pay national insurance contributions (such as the homeless, the physically disabled, and unmarried mothers) and were therefore left uncovered by the National Insurance Act 1946 and the National Insurance (Industrial Injuries) Act 1946. It also provided help to elderly Britons who required supplementary benefits to make a subsistence living, and obliged local authorities to provide suitable accommodation for those who through infirmity, age, or any other reason were in need of care and attention not otherwise available. The legislation also empowered local authorities to grant financial aid to organizations of volunteers concerned with the provision of recreational facilities or meals.

The National Assistance Board, which administered the National Assistance scheme, operated scale rates which were more generous than in the past. The rate for a married couple before the new service was launched, for instance, was 31 shillings (£1.55) a week, and 40 shillings (£2.00) a week when the new service was introduced, together with an allowance for rent. In addition, as noted by Denis Nowell Pritt, "In most cases where the applicant was a householder, the rent allowance was the actual rent paid."

Under Section 29 of the Act, the power was granted to local authorities to promote the welfare of physically disabled individuals. The social needs of the mentally disabled were to be the responsibility of mental health departments which, being part of the new National Health Service, were to provide its services to all those who needed it, regardless of ability to pay.

See also
Pensions in the United Kingdom

Notes
Notes

Bibliography

External links 

 National Assistance Act 1948 as enacted

Poor Law in Britain and Ireland
United Kingdom Acts of Parliament 1948
Welfare state in the United Kingdom